Peter Christopher Yorke (13 August 1864 – 4 April 1925) was an American Irish Catholic priest and an Irish Republican and Labor activist in San Francisco.

Early life

Born on Galway's Long Walk on 13 August 1864, he was the youngest child of Gregory Yorke, a sea captain, and his wife, Bridget, née Kelly. Gregory Yorke died six months before Peter was born.

The Yorke family were originally from Holland, where the name was spelled Jorke. Peter Yorke's grandfather, Christopher Yorke, came to Galway in the early 19th century, building lighthouses and breakwaters in Galway, Aran and Westport.

Priesthood

In 1882, after initially schooling at Coláiste Iognáid Galway, Yorke then graduated from St. Jarlath's College in Tuam. He then went to St. Patrick's College, Maynooth, where he studied for four years before being adopted by the Archdiocese of San Francisco. He was ordained in 1887. He was pastor of St. Peter's in 1914.

In San Francisco, he became the editor of The Monitor, the official newspaper of the archdiocese. In 1901, he supported the workers in a Teamsters strike. In 1902, he founded and edited a local newspaper called The Leader.

Yorke was the author of the best-selling textbook The Ghosts of Bigotry, originally republished in San Francisco 1913 from new plates, the originals having been destroyed in the earthquake and fire of 1906. It was the genesis work of the Catholic Truth Society, in response to an anti-Catholic literary campaign by the American Protestant Association, and a frank account of the "Black Myths" of English Protestant opposition to the Roman Catholic Church from the reign of Elizabeth I through to Catholic Emancipation and the Ecclesiastical Titles Act 1851 in the 19th century. Its concluding chapter sets the scene of Catholic resurgence in the USA. The publisher was the Text Book Publishing Company, 641 Stevenson Street.

Legacy
Yorke is buried at Holy Cross Cemetery in Colma, California.

Every Palm Sunday the United Irish Societies of San Francisco hold a memorial celebration of Peter Yorke at Holy Cross Cemetery. Following the Palm Sunday Mass at All Saints Chapel, there is a short procession to his graveside.  There poems, music and speeches celebrate his life.

A short street called Peter Yorke Way in San Francisco, which runs from the junction of Geary Boulevard and Gough Street to Post Street, is named after him. The headquarters of the archdiocese is located at 1 Peter Yorke Way.

References

 Joseph S. Brusher, Consecrated Thunderbolt: Father Yorke of San Francisco (Hawthorne, New Jersey: Joseph F. Wagner, Inc., 1973)
Sr. Mary Camilla Fitzmaurice, Historical Development of the Educational Thought of the Reverend Peter C. Yorke, 1893–1925 (1963)
James P. Walsh, Ethnic Militancy: An Irish Catholic Prototype (San Francisco: R and E Research Associates, 1972)
Priscilla F. Knuth, Nativism in California, 1886–1897.
God give us men.
The Virtual Museum of the City of San Francisco

External links

YouTube links

1864 births
1925 deaths
19th-century Irish people
People from Galway (city)
Roman Catholic Archdiocese of San Francisco
Alumni of St Patrick's College, Maynooth
Irish humanitarians
Irish revolutionaries
19th-century American Roman Catholic priests